This is a list of Bishops and Archbishops of Toledo. They are also the Primates of Spain. It was, according to tradition established in the 1st century by James the Great and was elevated to an archdiocese in 313 after the Edict of Milan. The incumbent Metropolitan Archbishop also bears the title Primate of Spain and since 1937 the title General Vicar of the Armies (but the pastoral care for the Spanish armed forces is now provided, since 1986, by the Military Archbishopric of Spain)

List

Bishops
 1 Eugenius (1st century?)
 Unknown
 2 Melantius (286?–306?)
 Unknown

Archbishops
 3 Patruinus (325–335) 
 4 Toribius (335–345) 
 5 Quintus (345–355) 
 6 Vincent (355–365) 
 7 Paulatus (365–375) 
 8 Natallus (375–385) 
 9 Audentius (385–395) 
 10 Asturius (395–412) 
 11 Isicius (412–427) 
 12 Martin I (427–440) 
 13 Castinus (440–454) 
 14 Campeius (454–467) 
 15 Sinticius (467–482)  
 16 Praumatus (482–494) 
 17 Petrus I (494–508) 
 18 Celsus (?–520) 
 19 Montanus (523–531)
 20 Julian I 
 21 Bacauda 
 22 Petrus II 
 23 Euphemius 
 24 Exuperius 
 25 Adelphus 
 26 Conancius 
 27 Aurasius (603–615) 
 28 Eladius (615–633)
 29 Justus (633–636)
 30 Eugenius I (636–646) 
 31 Eugenius II (646–657) 
 32 Ildefonso (657–667)
 33 Quiricus (667–680) 
 34 Julian II (680–690) 
 35 Sisbert (690–693) 
 36 Felix (694–700) 
 37 Gunderic (700–710) 
 38 Sindered (711–?) 
 39 Sunirend 
 40 Concordius 
 41 Cixila (745/774–754/783) 
 42 Elipandus (754/783–808?) 
 43 Gumesind (?–828) 
 44 Wistremir (?–858)
 (Eulogius 859; elected but did not take office) 
 45 Bonitus (859–892) 
 46 Juan I (892–926)
 47 Ubayd Allah ben Qasim

See vacant due to Muslim rule (Umayyad Caliphate of Cordoba)

 48 Pascual I (1058–1080) 
 Vacant 
 49 Bernard de Sedirac (1086–1124) 
 50 Raymond de Sauvetât (1124–1152) 
 51 Juan II (1152–1166) 
 52 Cerebruno (1167–1180) 
 53 Pedro III de Cardona (1181–1182) 
 54 Gonzalo I Petrez (1182–1191) 
 55 Martín II López de Pisuerga (1192–1208) 
 56 Rodrigo Jimenez de Rada (1209–1247) 
 57 Juan III Medina de Pomar (1248–1248) 
 58 Gutierre I Ruiz Dolea (1249–1250) 
 59 Infante Sancho of Castile (1251–1261) 
 60 Domingo Pascual (1262–1265) 
 61 Infante Sancho of Aragon (1266–1275) 
 62 Fernando I Rodriguez de Covarubias (1276–1280) 
 63 Gonzalo II Pérez Gudiel (1280–1299) 
 64 Gonzalo III Diaz Palomeque (1299–1310) 
 65 Gutierre II Gomez de Toledo (1310–1319) 
 66 Juan III, Infante of Aragon (1319–1328); also Latin Patriarch of Alexandria 
 67 Jimeno de Luna (1328–1338) 
 68 Gil Alvarez de Albornoz (1338–1350) 
 69 Gonzalo IV de Aguilar (1351–1353) 
 70 Blas Fernandez de Toledo (1353–1362) 
 71 Gómez Manrique (bishop) (1362–1375) 
 72 Pedro IV Tenorio (1375–1399) 
 Vacant
 73 Pedro V de Luna (1403–1414) 
 74 Sancho III de Rojas (1415–1422) 
 75 Juan IV Martinez de Contreras (1423–1434) 
 76 Juan V de Cerezuela (1434–1442) 
 77 Gutierre III Alvarez de Toledo (1442–1445) 
 78 Alfonso Carillo de Acuna (1446–1482) 
 79 Pedro VI Gonzalez de Mendoza (1482–1495) 
 80 Francisco I Ximénez de Cisneros (1495–1517) 
 81 Guillermo de Croy (1517–1521) 
 Vacant 
 82 Alonso III Fonseca (1523–1534) 
 83 Juan VI Pardo Tavera (1534–1545) 
 84 Juan VII Martinez Silecio (1545–1557) 
 85 Bartolomé Carranza (1558–1576) 
 86 Gaspar I de Quiroga y Vela (1577–1594) 
 87 Archduke Albert of Austria (1595–1598) 
 88 Garcia Loayasa y Giron (1598–1599) 
 89 Bernardo II de Sandoval y Rojas (1599–1618) 
 Vacant 
 90 Ferdinand of Austria (Apostolic Administrator, 1620–1641) 
 Vacant 
 91 Gaspar II de Borja y Velasco (1645) 
 92 Baltasar Moscoso y Sandoval (1646–1665) 
 93 Pascual II de Aragon (1666–1677) 
 94 Luis Manuel Fernández de Portocarrero (1677–1709) 
 Vacant 
 95 Francisco Valero y Losa (1715–1720) 
 96 Diego de Astorga y Céspedes (1720–1724) 
 Vacant 
 97 Luis I de Borbon y Farnesio (1735–1754) 
 98 Luis II Fernandez de Cordoba (1755–1771) 
 99 Francisco Antonio de Lorenzana (1772–1800) 
 100 Luis María de Borbón y Vallabriga, 14th Count of Chinchón (1800–1823) 
 101 Pedro Inguanzo y Rivero (1824–1836) 
 Vacant 
 102 Juan José Bonel y Orbe (1849–1857) 
 103 Cirilo Alameda y Brea (1857–1872) 
 Vacant 
 104 Juan Ignacio Moreno y Maisanove (1875–1884) 
 105 Zeferino Gonzalez y Diaz–Tunon (1885–1886)
 106 Miguel Paya y Rico (1886–1891) 
 107 Antolín Monescillo y Viso (1892–1898) 
 108 Bl. Ciriaco María Sancha y Hervás (1898–1909) 
 109 Gregorio Maria Aguirre y Garcia (1909–1913) 
 110 Victoriano Guisasola y Menendez (1913–1920) 
 111 Enrique Almaraz y Santos (1920–1921) 
 112 Enrique Reig y Casanova (1922–1927) 
 113 Pedro Segura y Sáenz (1927–1931) 
 Vacant 
 114 Isidro Goma y Tomas (1933–1940) 
 115 Enrique Pla y Deniel (1941–1968)  
 116 Vicente Enrique y Tarancón (1969–1972) 
 117 Marcelo Gonzalez Martin (1972–1995) 
 118 Francisco Alvarez Martínez (1995–2002)
 119 Antonio Cañizares Llovera (2002–2008)
 120 Braulio Rodríguez Plaza (2009–2019)
 121 Francisco Cerro Chaves (2019–present)

Auxiliary bishops in the archdiocese

Suffragan dioceses
Diocese of Albacete.
Diocese of Ciudad Real.
Diocese of Cuenca.
Diocese of Sigüenza-Guadalajara.

See also
Council of Elvira
 Councils of Toledo
 Patriarch of the West Indies
 Grand Inquisitor
 Mozarabic Rite
 Roman Catholicism in Spain

References

Archdiocese of Toledo (in Spanish)
New Advent

Toledo